James Powderly (born 1976) is an artist, designer and engineer whose work has focused on creating tools for graffiti artists and political activists, designing robots and augmented reality platforms, and promoting open source culture.

Biography 
Powderly studied music composition at the University of Tennessee at Chattanooga. After college, he received a master's degree from New York University's Interactive Telecommunications Program. James worked at Honeybee Robotics and was part of the team that worked on the Mars Exploration Rovers Rock Abrasion Tool. As the collaborative team Robot Clothes, Powderly and artist Michelle Kempner, received an artist residency at Eyebeam for its project, Automated Biography. The project used small robots to tell the "personal story about a sick person and their partner".

In 2005, Powderly became a Research and Development Fellow at Eyebeam where he began collaborating with Evan Roth. Working as the Graffiti Research Lab, Roth and Powderly developed open source tools for graffiti writers and activists, such as LED Throwies and L.A.S.E.R. Tag. Together, they also founded the Free Art and Technology Lab (F.A.T. Lab). Most recently, Powderly has won awards for his work on the EyeWriter project, including the 2009 Design of the Year in Interactive Art from the Design Museum, London, the 2010 Prix Ars Electronica, the 2010 FutureEverything Award and featured on NPR and TED.

Exhibitions 
Selected exhibitions, screenings and performances include:
 2004 ArtBots, Harlem, New York
 2005 Eyebeam with Michelle Kempner, New York
 2006 Ars Electronica, Goodbye Privacy, Linz, Austria
 2007 Sundance Film Festival, New Frontiers, Park City, Utah
 2007 2nd Digital Arts Festival, OpenPlay, Taipei City, Taiwan
 2007 Microwave Festival, Luminous Echo, Hong Kong
 2007 Ars Electronica, Second City, Linz, Austria
 2007 Esther M Klein Gallery, "Artbots", Philadelphia, Pennsylvania
 2007 Eyebeam, Open City, New York City, New York
 2008 Elizabeth Foundation for the Arts, Beyond a Memorable Fancy, New York City
 2008 Museum of Modern Art, Rough Cut: Design Takes a Sharp Edge, New York City
 2008 Museum of Modern Art, Design and the Elastic Mind, New York City
 2008 Tate Modern, Street Art, London, UK
 2009 Platoon Kunsthalle, Showcase, Seoul, South Korea
 2009 Street Art Dealer Interactive Exhibition, Bristol, UK
 2010 Design Museum, Brit. Insurance Design of the Year 2010, London, UK
 2011 Museum of Modern Art, Talk to Me, New York City
 2012 Ljudmila, "The Lickers", Ljublana, Slovenia, 2012
 2013 Eyebeam, FAT GOLD, New York, NY

Detention in China 
In June 2008, before the 2008 Summer Olympics, Powderly was contacted by Students for a Free Tibet who wanted to use his laser stencil invention, which can laser project simple stencils up to 2 km away, to project the words "Free Tibet" on a Beijing landmark, without acquiring any permission from the local authority. He said, "My understanding of the Tibetan issue was not in depth," but that he wanted to make "a general statement about freedom of speech". After practicing his message projection out of an apartment, he and two other protesters were arrested, interrogated, and detained at Chongwen Detention Center and given 10 days for "disrupting public order", which is unusual for American activists detained in China. He was released on the closing day of the Olympics, on August 24.

See also 
Graffiti Research Lab

References

External links 

Free Art and Technology Lab
Robot Clothes project website robotclothes.com
Eyebeam Openlab

1976 births
Living people
American conceptual artists
American digital artists
Artists from New York (state)
American graffiti artists
American expatriates in South Korea
Academic staff of Hongik University